Sylvirana maosonensis is a species of frog in the family Ranidae. It is found in the mountains of central and northeastern in Vietnam, Annamite Range in central Laos, and southern Guanxi, China. Its common name is Mao-Son frog or Maoson frog, after its type locality in Vietnam. Individuals are typically found near streams on banks, leaf litter, and low in vegetation. Reproduction takes place in streams, ponds, and ditches. It is a locally common frog. Although International Union for Conservation of Nature (IUCN) does not considered it threatened as a species, habitat loss and degradation are threats.

References

maosonensis
Amphibians of China
Amphibians of Laos
Amphibians of Vietnam
Amphibians described in 1937
Taxonomy articles created by Polbot
Taxa named by René Léon Bourret